Marco Albertoni (born 5 August 1995) is an Italian footballer who plays as a goalkeeper.

Club career
He made his Serie C debut for SPAL on 8 February 2015 in a game against Ascoli.

On 20 September 2019, he signed a 1-year deal with Perugia.

On 9 September 2021, he joined Serie C club Renate.

References

External links
 

1995 births
Living people
Footballers from Genoa
Italian footballers
Association football goalkeepers
Serie C players
Genoa C.F.C. players
S.P.A.L. players
Mantova 1911 players
U.S. Pistoiese 1921 players
S.S.D. Lucchese 1905 players
Albissola 2010 players
A.C. Perugia Calcio players
Ravenna F.C. players
A.C. Renate players
21st-century Italian people